The Moth and the Flame is a 1915 American silent drama film produced by Famous Players Film Company and distributed by Paramount Pictures. It was directed by Sidney Olcott and is based upon the play of the same name by Clyde Fich.

Cast
Stewart Baird as Edward Fletcher
Edward Mordant as Mr. Dawson
Bradley Barker as Douglas Rhodes
Arthur Donaldson as Mr. Walton
Adele Rey as Marion Walton
Dora Mills Adams as Mrs. Walton
Irene Howley as Jeannette Graham
Maurice Stewart as Jeannette's child

Production notes
The film was shot in Jacksonville, Florida.

External links

The Moth and the Flame website dedicated to Sidney Olcott
Film stills at silentfilmstillarchive.com

1915 films
American silent feature films
American black-and-white films
Films directed by Sidney Olcott
1915 drama films
Silent American drama films
1910s American films